Alliance 90/The Greens Hamburg is the Hamburg state association of Alliance '90/The Greens. Until 21 April 2012, it was known as the "Green-Alternative List" (Grün-Alternative Liste). Though most green-alternative lists are not part of Alliance 90/The Greens in Germany, Hamburg was special in that its GAL had been the Hamburg state association of the party since 1984.

On Sunday February 23, 2020, in the Hamburg state election The Greens Hamburg were the biggest winners. They roughly doubled their vote to 24.2%.

Election results

Bürgerschaft of Hamburg

References

External links
Official website

Alliance 90/The Greens
State sections of political parties in Germany
Politics of Hamburg